William Gordon Cornwallis Eliot, 4th Earl of St Germans (14 December 1829 – 19 March 1881), known as Lord Eliot from 1864 to 1877, was a British diplomat and Liberal politician. He was also a president of the Church of England Society for the Maintenance of the Faith.

Life and career
Eliot was born at Port Eliot, Cornwall, the third but eldest surviving son of Edward Granville Eliot, 3rd Earl of St Germans, and his wife Jemima (née Cornwallis). He was educated at Eton College and then joined the Diplomatic Service. His assignments included:

 Attaché at Hanover from 1849 to 1853
 Attaché at Lisbon from 1851 to 1853
 2nd Paid Attaché at Berlin from 1853 to 1857
 1st Paid Attaché at Constantinople from 1857 to 1858
 1st Paid Attaché at Saint Petersburg from 1858 to 1859
 Secretary of Legation at Rio de Janeiro in 1859
 Secretary of Legation at Athens from 1859 to 1861
 Secretary of Legation at Lisbon from 1860 to 1861 
 Chargé d'Affaires at Rio de Janeiro from 1861 to 1863
 Acting Secretary of Legation at Washington, D.C. from 1863 to 1864

He resigned in 1865 and was elected Member of Parliament for Devonport in 1866, a seat he held until 1868. In 1870 he was summoned to the House of Lords through a writ of acceleration in his father's junior title of Baron Eliot. Lord St Germans died unmarried in March 1881, aged 51 and is buried, near his mother, at Kensal Green Cemetery. He was succeeded by his younger brother, Henry.

References

External links
 
 
 

St Germans, William Gordon Cornwallis Eliot, 4th Earl of
St Germans, William Gordon Cornwallis Eliot, 4th Earl of
St Germans, William Gordon Cornwallis Eliot, 4th Earl
St Germans, William Gordon Cornwallis Eliot, 4th Earl of
Earls of St Germans
William Gordon Eliot
Liberal Party (UK) MPs for English constituencies
People from St Germans, Cornwall
UK MPs 1865–1868
Saint Germans, E4